1930 Земля / Earth, directed by Oleksandr Dovzhenko (silent film)
 1932 Іван / Ivan, directed by Oleksandr Dovzhenko (silent film)
 1932 Коліївщина / Koliyivshchyna, directed by Ivan Kavaleridze
 1935 Аероград / Aerograd, directed by Oleksandr Dovzhenko (sci-fi)
 1936 Наталка Полтавка / Natalka Poltavka, directed by Ivan Kavaleridze
 1936 Прометей / Prometheus, directed by Ivan Kavaleridze
 1939 Щорс / Shchors, directed by Oleksandr Dovzhenko (documentary film)

1930s
Films
Ukrainian